Bright Star, also spelled Brightstar, is an unincorporated community in Blount County, Alabama, United States.

History
A post office was established as Brightstar in 1889, and remained in operation until it was discontinued in 1907.

References

Unincorporated communities in Blount County, Alabama
Unincorporated communities in Alabama